The SWM X7 is a 7-seater compact crossover SUV that is manufactured by the Chinese manufacturer SWM (automobiles) of Brilliance Shineray. The SWM X7 was launched in December 2016 in China.

Overview

Formerly known as the SWM X5 during development phase, there are two engines available for the SWM X7, including a 1.5 liter turbo producing 156hp and 230nm and a 1.8 liter producing 137hp and 258nm, both mated to either a five-speed manual gearbox or a CVT.  Prices of the SWM X7 ranges from 85,900 yuan to 118,900 yuan.

References

External links

X7
Mid-size sport utility vehicles
Crossover sport utility vehicles
2010s cars
Cars introduced in 2016
Front-wheel-drive vehicles
Cars of China